The Borgward IV, officially designated Schwerer Ladungsträger Borgward B IV (heavy explosive carrier Borgward B IV), was a German remote-controlled demolition vehicle used in World War II.

Design 
During World War II, the Wehrmacht used three remotely operated demolition tanks: the light Goliath (Sd.Kfz. 302/303a/303b), the medium Springer (Sd.Kfz. 304) and the heavy Borgward IV (Sd.Kfz. 301). The Borgward IV was the largest of the vehicles and the only one capable of releasing its explosives before detonating; the two smaller vehicles were destroyed when their explosive charges detonated.

Borgward originally developed the B IV as an ammunition carrier, but it was found unsuitable. It was also tested as a remote minesweeper, but was too vulnerable to mines and too expensive. During the Battle of France, German engineers from the 1st Panzer Division converted 10 Panzer I Ausf Bs into demolition and mine clearing vehicles, using them to place timed charges on bunkers or minefields without losing the vehicle. The Waffenamt found the idea valuable, and ordered the B IV's development as a remote-controlled demolition vehicle. The first vehicles were delivered in 1942.

The Borgward IV was much heavier than the Goliath, and carried a much larger payload. The Borgward IV was operated by radio and the Goliath was wire guided, due to the Borgward IV's much longer range a driver in the vehicle would bring it independently to its destination before dismounting. Actual control during an attack was done from an armored fighting vehicle. The original vehicle used was the Panzer III tank. Then the StuG III/G and finally the Tiger IE. These vehicles had added radio equipment and the controller directed the BIV to its target by radio. When it reached the target, the vehicle would drop the charge and leave the danger area. While the Borgward IV was armored, its armor was only 8mm in the A and B versions and 20mm in the C version, enough to protect from small arms and splinters, inadequate to protect from anti-tank rifles or even light anti-tank guns.  The larger size than the Goliath made it much easier to spot and target and like the Goliath in order to drive it remotely the controller had to see both the target and the carrier.<Markus Jaugitz>

Variants 
Three models of the Borgward were produced, Ausführung (abbreviated to Ausf.) A, Ausf. B and Ausf. C, primarily differing in armor, weight and radio equipment.

The Borgward IV Ausf. A, the first model to enter serial production, was equipped with a 49-horsepower 4-cylinder water-cooled gasoline engine. Ausf. A was the most produced model, with approximately 616 produced between May 1942 and June 1943.

In June 1943, production shifted to the similar Borgward IV Ausf. B. The Ausf. B weighed  more, the radio antenna was moved and better radio equipment was used. From June to November 1943, 260 of this model were produced.

The final Borgward IV to see production, the Ausf. C, saw greater changes. The armor on the Ausf. C was thicker than the previous variants, new tracks were used, the driver's seat was moved to the left of the vehicle and a new 78 horsepower six-cylinder engine was used. The Ausf. C was produced from December 1943 to September 1944 when production ended, with 305 examples built.

Near the end of World War II, approximately 56 Ausf. Bs and Cs were converted to the Panzerjäger Wanze, armed with six RPzB 54/1 anti-tank rockets. In the last days of the war, these vehicles fought some minor skirmishes against Soviet armor and saw some action at the Battle of Berlin.

At least one Ausf. B was rebuilt as an amphibious vehicle, and in 1943 one Borgward IV was equipped with a television camera for observation.

Borgward IV production was relatively small: only 1,181 were produced, as compared to the 7,564 of the much smaller Goliath. Like Germany's other remote-controlled demolition vehicles, the Borgward IV was not considered a success; it was unreliable and expensive, although unlike the Goliath and Springer it could be used multiple times.

Survivors 
Surviving examples of the Borgward IV are displayed in the Heeresgeschichtliches Museum in Vienna, the Kubinka Tank Museum, the American Heritage Museum in Greater Boston, USA, and the German Tank Museum in Munster. A fourth one in working condition is displayed in the Overlord Museum in Colleville-sur-Mer (Normandy-France).

On 31 March 2010, demolition work and excavation at Wien Südbahnhof uncovered a relatively well-preserved Borgward IV along with other relics from the Vienna Offensive. The Heeresgeschichtliches Museum salvaged and restored it for display there.

A full-scale, driveable replica was built in Poland for the shooting of Warsaw 44.

See also 
 Teletank
 Mobile Land Mine
 Unmanned ground vehicle
 American military report on the Borgward IV

Notes

References 
 Thomas Ilming: Die „Wunderwaffe“ unter dem Südbahnhof: Borgward B IV c, in: Viribus Unitis, Jahresbericht 2010 des Heeresgeschichtlichen Museums. Wien 2011, S. 150-156, 
 Alexander Lüdeke,  Waffentechnik im Zweiten Weltkrieg. Infanteriewaffen, ungepanzerte Fahrzeuge, gepanzerte Fahrzeuge, Artillerie, Spezialwaffen, Flugzeuge, Schiffe. Parragon Books, Bath 2007, .
 Markus Jaugitz: Die deutsche Fernlenktruppe 1940–1943. Podzun-Pallas, Wölfersheim-Berstadt 1994, (Waffen-Arsenal Special 10).
 Markus Jaugitz: Die deutsche Fernlenktruppe 1943–1945. Podzun-Pallas, Wölfersheim-Berstadt 1995, (Waffen-Arsenal Special 12).

IV
Military robots
World War II vehicles of Germany
Robots of Germany
Tracked robots
1940s robots
Military vehicles introduced from 1940 to 1944
Military vehicles of Germany